Seward is a borough in Westmoreland County, Pennsylvania, United States. The population was four hundred and ninety-five at the time of the 2010 census. 

It is also one of three communities within the county to utilize the 814 area code, along with St. Clair and New Florence.

History
In June 1902, three men were killed instantly, two were fatally hurt and five others were injured, including one man who later died, following an explosion at the Cambria powder plant's coining mill in Seward. According to news coverage, "The explosion occurred as the men were loading a pot of powder on a wagon driven by" one of the victims, thirty-eight-year-old John Rhoads, who reportedly left a large family. The others who were killed were: Seward resident J. B. Smith, aged forty, who was also the head of a large family; Charles Drover, a thirty-five-year-old, unmarried resident of Wapwallopen in Luzerne County, Pennsylvania; and Seward resident W. F. Bracken, who was married with three children.

A second, similar explosion then occurred in Seward at the Conemaugh Powder Works on December 7, 1903, killing worker Alfred Beatty and seriously injuring four other men.

On January 4, 1908, Seward resident Patrick Kerwin, who was reportedly the oldest person alive in Pennsylvania at that time, died at the age of one hundred and eleven. A native of Ireland, he had been born on St. Patrick's Day in 1796.

Geography
Seward is located at  (40.414759, -79.022856).

Seward is entirely surrounded by St. Clair Township

The community was impacted by the Johnstown flood of 1977; seven people died as a result of the disaster.

Demographics

At the 2000 census there were four hundred and eight-four people, one hundred and ninety-nine households and one hundred and twenty-nine families living in the borough. 

The population density was 2,255.1 people per square mile (889.9/km²). There were two hundred and twenty-six housing units at an average density of 1,053.0 per square mile (415.5/km²). 

The racial makeup of the borough was 99.17% White, 0.21% African American, and 0.62% from two or more races. Hispanic or Latino of any race were 0.21%.

Of the one hundred and ninety-nine households 22.6% had children under the age of eighteen living with them, 54.8% were married couples living together, 7.5% had a female householder with no husband present, and 34.7% were non-families. 30.7% of households were one person and 19.1% were one person aged sixty-five or older. The average household size was 2.36 and the average family size was 2.91.

The age distribution was 20.5% under the age of eighteen, 5.8% from eighteen to twenty-four, 26.7% from twenty-five to forty-four, 25.8% from forty-five to sixty-four, and 21.3% who were aged sixty-five or older. The median age was forty-three years. 

For every one hundred females, there were 94.4 males. For every one hundred females aged eighteen and over, there were 94.4 males.

The median household income was $29,583 and the median family income was $38,500. Males had a median income of $32,083 compared with $18,333 for females. The per capita income for the borough was $14,585. 

Roughly 4.9% of families and 12.2% of the population were below the poverty line, including 15.7% of those under the age of eighteen and 21.6% of those aged sixty-five or over.

References

External links
Seward, Pennsylvania (profile). Middleton, Wisconsin: Ballotpedia, retrieved online January 28, 2023.

Boroughs in Westmoreland County, Pennsylvania
Populated places established in 1904
Pittsburgh metropolitan area
1904 establishments in Pennsylvania